"Pouta" is a last single from the Katarze album of Czech pop music group Slza. The music was created by Lukáš Bundil and Dalibor Cidlinský Jr. and the text composed by Xindl X.

Music video 
A music video containing the materials of the Vevo sponsor was released for this single. The video was directed by Roland Wranik from Slovakia from production company SorryWeCan. Finalist of Miss Slovakia, Lucia Uhrinová, played in the clip with Petr Lexa and Lukáš Bundil. The video has gathered more than 2.5 million views on YouTube.

References 

Slza songs
Universal Music Group singles
2016 singles
2015 songs
Songs written by Xindl X